The Melocanninae is a subtribe of bamboo (tribe Bambuseae of the family Poaceae).

Genera 
Nine genera were accepted by Soreng et al.:
Annamocalamus
Cephalostachyum
Davidsea
Melocanna
Neohouzeaua
Ochlandra
Pseudostachyum
Schizostachyum
Stapletonia

References

Bambusoideae
Plant subtribes